Compressible Duct Flow with friction. This article concerns a gas flow with friction due to the boundary walls under consideration. This problem is same as the Moody type pipe-friction problem but with considerably larger changes in friction, kinetic energy and enthalpy of the flow.

Parameters
Consider a gas flowing through a duct with the following assumptions :
 Constant area, straight duct
 Gas is ideal
 Negligible potential energy changes and low work input
 One dimensional adiabatic flow
 Darcy friction factor used to express wall shear stress due to friction

Calculation

Consider a small element of area A and length dx as shown in the figure (right). Applying conservation laws on this element,

-density

V-velocity of the element

A- cross sectional area

ρV A = G =constant

 ...(assumption 1)

.....(1)

By equating total force on the element to its change in momentum (following Newton’s second law),

....(2)

where   is shear stress due to boundary walls and thus  is force due to shear stress.

Total energy of the gas

.....(3)

Also by virtue of ideal gas equation

...(i)

...(4)

The relation between wall shear and Darcy friction factor f is given by,

But we know that  where a is the speed of sound in perfect gas. ....(ii)

Therefore the above equation transforms into-

....(5)

Where Ma is the Mach number which is defined as the ratio of velocity of sound in that medium to the velocity of the object under consideration i.e V/a.....(iii)

Thus from (i), (ii),(iii)

.....(6)

By eliminating variables from eq 1 to 6 we get the following relations:

All the equations above have a factor of  except  ;thus the following deductions could be made :

Irrespective of the flow, Mach number tends downstream towards 1 because entropy increases alongside. Entropy v/s Mach number graph is as shown in the figure (for k=1.4):

Entropy is maximum at Ma=1 so sonic point is eventually achieved by virtue of second law. Since  and  decrease along the flow in this case, the sonic properties (p*, ῥ*, T*, and ) are considered as references.

Now,
By manipulating equation 11 and integrating bothsides we get,

L* is the length from some arbitrary point where Mach number is Ma. At the sonic region, Ma=1. The integration results in the following equation :

Where f- is average friction factor from x=0 to L*. Here D is the diameter of circular duct; in cases where the duct is not of circular cross section D=(4*area)/perimeter.

Choking due to friction

Choking of duct is basically reduction of duct mass flow. The flow conditions change if the actual length L is greater than the predicted maximum length L*, and there are two classifications :

Subsonic inlet
If L > L*(Ma1), the flow slows down until an inlet Mach number Ma2 is reached such that L = L*(Ma2). The exit flow is sonic, and the mass flow has been reduced by frictional choking. Further increases in duct length will continue to decrease the inlet Ma and mass flow.

Supersonic inlet
Friction has a large impact on supersonic duct flow. Even an infinite inlet Mach number will be reduced to sonic conditions in only 41 diameters for f = 0.02. Consider an example inlet Ma = 3.0 and f=0.02. For this condition L*=26 diameters. If L is increased beyond 26D, the flow will not choke but a normal shock will form at just the right place for the subsequent subsonic frictional flow to become sonic exactly at the exit. Eventually, a long duct will cause the feednozzle throat to become choked, thus reducing the duct mass flow. Thus, supersonic friction changes the flow pattern if L > L* but does not choke the flow until
L is much larger than L*.

References

Fluid dynamics